Vasilis Diamantopoulos (15 November 1920 – 5 May 1999) was a Greek actor.  He was one of the founders of the Modern Theater and was the first actor to appear live on Greek television in the single act play "Him and his pants" of Iakovos Kambanellis in 1966.  His most characteristic role was that of the austere professor in Giannis Dalianidis' movie Law 4000 and later in shorts including Ekmek Ice Cream in private TV.

Biography

He was born in Piraeus and studied at Athens Law and at the National Theatre's Dramatic schools as well as Coon Art School.  He ran together along with Maria Alkeou in 1956 at the New Theatre/Theater and in 1993 at the Different Theatre.  He returned to Greece from Paris in 1970 and took part in several different companies, he also took part at the Public Theatre of Northern Greece.  He also participated in many film and television productions, oppositely took part at the Dramatic Schools at the National Theatre and at Art School.  His last years was a member of a hypocrite art factory for young actors.  He died in Athens in 1999 from a heart attack at the Athens General Clinic due to his head fracture at the left femur which triggered from the fall.  He is buried at the First Athens Cemetery.

Personal life

He was married twice, firstly to the actress Tonia Karali with whom he had a daughter and secondly to the actress Marina Georgiou with whom he had a son.

Filmography

Film

Television

References

External links

Filmography at retrodb.gr
Photos of the actor and filmography at 90lepta.com 

1920 births
1999 deaths
Greek male actors
Greek male stage actors
Greek male film actors
Male actors from Attica
Actors from Piraeus
Recipients of the Order of George I
20th-century Greek male actors